Prematho Raa ( Come with Love) is a 2001 Indian Telugu-language romance film produced by T. Trivikrama Rao under the Vijayalakshmi Art Movies banner, directed by Udayasankar. It stars Venkatesh and Simran, with music composed by Mani Sharma. The film was recorded as a flop at the box office. This was the second collaboration between Venkatesh, Simran and Director Udayasankar after Kalisundam Raa but couldn't repeat that film's success. The film was dubbed into Tamil as Kadhal Galatta.

Plot
Chandu and Vijay are brothers. They belong to a wealthy family where the elder brother Vijay is responsible for taking care of the business. The younger one Chandu is a spoilt brat and a womanizer.

Vijay is in love with Sandhya. Chandu happens to visit Ooty and falls for a damsel, Geeta. But Geeta remains aloof. So he plays different tricks to attract her. One fine day he expresses his love to her and duly deflowers her. The next day, he takes the train to Hyderabad without informing Geeta and attends the marriage of his brother Vijay and Sandhya. At the time of marriage, Sandhya enters the scene with Geeta claiming that Geeta is the younger sister of her and Geeta was used by Chandu to satisfy his lust. Sandhya breaks the marriage with Vijay.

Chandu realizes his mistake and repents for the same. He approaches Sandhya and pleads with her. She gives him an opportunity to change. If she realizes that Chandu is a changed man after six months, then she will endorse the marriage of Chandu and Geeta. The rest of the film is all about how effectively Chandu convinces Geeta.

Cast

 Venkatesh as Chandu
 Simran as Geeta
 Suresh as Vijay
 Prema as Sandhya 
 Murali Mohan as Chandu's father
 Sujatha as Chandu's grandmother
 Kota Srinivasa Rao as Chandu's grandfather
 Brahmanandam as hotel server
 Ali as Chandu's friend
 AVS as Astrologist
 Asha Saini as Anitha
 Isha Koppikar as Swetha
 Mink Brar as Bharathi
 L. B. Sriram
 Rama Prabha
 Prasad Babu 
 Subbaraya Sharma 
 Madhurisen as Geetha's friend
 Kalpana Rai as Seetamma
 Junior Relangi 
 Gowtham Raju 
 Mithai Chitti
 Gadiraju Subba Rao
 Mukhtar Khan as Jagan
 Naveen 
 Sri Harsha 
 Radha 
 Indu Anand 
 Banda Jyothi
 Richa Pallod (Special appearance)

Soundtrack

Music composed by Mani Sharma. Music released on ADITYA Music Company.

References

2001 films
Films scored by Mani Sharma
Indian romantic drama films
2000s Telugu-language films
Telugu films remade in other languages
2001 romantic drama films
Films directed by Udayasankar